Jurassic World Evolution 2 is a construction and management simulation video game developed and published by Frontier Developments. A sequel to Jurassic World Evolution (2018) and set after Jurassic World: Fallen Kingdom, the game was released for Microsoft Windows, PlayStation 4, PlayStation 5, Xbox One, and Xbox Series X and Series S on November 9, 2021. The game received generally positive reviews from critics, who deemed it an improvement over its predecessor.

Gameplay
Similar to the first game, Evolution 2 is a business simulation in which the player constructs a Jurassic World prehistoric theme park. The game features more than 75 prehistoric species, including various dinosaurs, pterosaurs, and marine reptiles. Players need to build enclosures, aviaries, and lagoons to contain these animals for visitors' viewing. These animals have different needs, such as the type of food they eat and the extent of forestation they require in their habitat, that must be met to keep them healthy and satisfied. The game features a dynamic territory system which sees animals combating against each other for resources if they live in the same habitat. Their territories are constantly shifting depending on the resources available in their habitat. When compared with its predecessors, the game features a more complex artificial intelligence for the prehistoric species, which will now hunt in packs and interact with others more frequently and realistically. The terrain tool has been completely reworked, with players needing to plant the appropriate trees and shrubs for the herbivores to eat.

Players need to build various facilities and recruit scientists for research and incubating the prehistoric species. The scientists recruited offer different gameplay benefits, but overworked and disgruntled workers will sabotage the park and intentionally let the animals escape. To incubate a prehistoric animal, the player must first extract their DNA from their fossils. Their DNA can be adjusted to give the animals unique traits, such as resilience towards a certain kind of disease. Players also need to recruit rangers and veterinarians in order to keep the animals happy and healthy. To entertain the guests, players can construct different rides such as the Gyrospheres, which can now pass through multiple enclosures and be attacked by prehistoric animals. Guests are categorised into different groups with different interests. For instance, nature lovers are more keen to see herbivores, while adventurists are more interested in seeing carnivores. Amenities such as toilets, gift shops, and restaurants also need to be constructed, and players can customize them with different modules and decorations in order to meet the needs of different guests.

Unlike the first game, which is set on an archipelago, Evolution 2 is set in the contiguous United States and features various biomes such as forests and deserts, with each providing unique challenges for the player while they are designing their parks. The maps featured in the game are significantly larger than those in the first game. The game features various modes, including a campaign mode which is set after Jurassic World: Fallen Kingdom, a "Chaos Theory" mode which revisits key narrative moments in the films (such as constructing the Jurassic Park facility near San Diego, as seen in The Lost World: Jurassic Park), and the returning Challenge and Sandbox modes. Jeff Goldblum and Bryce Dallas Howard return to provide the voice for Ian Malcolm and Claire Dearing respectively.

Development and release

Like its predecessor, Jurassic World Evolution 2 was developed and published by Frontier Developments. The game was announced by Goldblum in June 2021 during Summer Game Fest. The game's campaign mode is considered canon with the films, taking place prior to the 2022 film Jurassic World Dominion. Frontier worked closely with Universal Pictures, ensuring that the game fits into the studio's future plans for the franchise. The company was given access to Universal's collection of sound effects and theme music from the films.

Jurassic World Evolution 2 was released on November 9, 2021, for Microsoft Windows, PlayStation 4, PlayStation 5, Xbox One, and Xbox Series X and Series S. Players who pre-ordered the game will receive three vehicle skins inspired by The Lost World: Jurassic Park.

Updates and DLC 
Like its predecessor, Jurassic World Evolution 2 will be supported post-launch with the release of paid DLC and free updates. The first DLC, the Early Cretaceous Pack, was released a month after the game's launch and adds four creatures from that era. The second DLC pack adds dinosaurs from the DreamWorks animated show Camp Cretaceous, and was released on March 8, 2022. The game's first expansion, the Dominion Biosyn Expansion, features a new campaign, new species, and new appearances based on Jurassic World Dominion, and released on June 14, 2022, four days after the film's release in the United States.
The Late Cretaceous pack that was released on September 15, 2022, added 4 species: Barbaridactylus, Styxosaurus, Australovenator, and Alamosaurus. The game's second expansion, the Dominion Malta Expansion, also featured a new campaign, new species, and new appearances based on Jurassic World Dominion, and was released on December 8, 2022.

Reception 

The game received generally positive reviews upon release according to review aggregator Metacritic.

PCGames N awarded the game 7: "Improves on its predecessor in clever ways and still boasts the most gorgeous dinosaurs ever made in a game. But dealing with disastrous events beyond your control still isn't any fun, even if it's thematic for the  Jurassic Park IP".

Early sales on the PC were lower than expected, as the game was released during the same week as several other high-profile PC games. The home console versions sold as expected, and the game had approximately 500,000 players across all platforms within two weeks of its release. Frontier expected the game to raise more revenue than its predecessor within its first year, in part because of the upcoming release of Jurassic World Dominion.

References

External links
 

2021 video games
Amusement park simulation games
Business simulation games
Jurassic Park video games
Video games based on films
Video games based on adaptations
PlayStation 4 games
PlayStation 5 games
Windows games
Xbox One games
Xbox Series X and Series S games
Frontier Developments games
Dinosaurs in video games
Video game sequels
Video games set in Arizona
Video games set in San Diego
Video games developed in the United Kingdom